Adolfo Martín González (9 December 1910 – 4 September 1975) was a Spanish footballer who played for La Liga side Real Betis. He is noted as being the first Real Betis player to score in La Liga. He scored in a 9–1 loss to the 1932–33 champions Athletic Bilbao. From 1932 through to 1936, Adolfo Martín appeared in 49 La Liga games, scoring 12 goals. He was born  in La Laguna, Tenerife.

References

External links 
 

1910 births
1975 deaths
Spanish footballers
La Liga players
Real Betis players
Association football midfielders